La Ciudad de las Ideas (stylized as CDI) is an annual conference held in Puebla, Mexico, produced by Mexican writer and television producer Andrés Roemer. Its objective is to debate ideas in science, technology, art, design, politics, education, culture, business, entertainment, and other areas of knowledge. The event has been referred to as the "brain olympics" by cognitive scientist Daniel Dennett.

CDI speakers have included Nobel Prize winners Jerome Isaac Friedman, Mario J. Molina, Jody Williams, Daniel Kahneman, and Paul Krugman; researchers Robert Sapolsky, Steven Pinker, Eduard Punset, Clotaire Rapaille, Tim Berners-Lee, David Buss, Richard Dawkins, Michael Shermer, Craig Venter, and Randi Zuckerberg; and Oscar nominees Adame Pesapane (PES) and Oliver Stone.

Since 2008, up to 3,600 attendees have gathered in November in the historic center of Puebla.

The head and curator of CDI is Andrés Roemer, partner of the NGO Poder Civico A.C., together with Ricardo Salinas Pliego, President and CEO of Grupo Salinas. The thematic approach of the curator of the speakers is as follows: "Scholars/Policy and Makers" (leading academics and public policy makers), "Mex-I-Can" (talented Mexicans), "W-Under18" (children and young people), Debates, Art, Emotional, Technology, Artistic Interventions, and Entertainment.

The festival has been promoted in Azteca Trece and Proyecto 40 and on the event's website, social media, and through a science bookstore located at the festival site.

Since 9 June 2008, over 231 festival speakers have had their presentations published online. Fifty percent of the audience are between 16 and 25 years old.

History

2008: Cynosura
The first conference took place in Puebla's Convention Center in 2008. Its name is derived from the star Polaris, also named Cynosura by the Greeks, pertaining to the Ursa Minor constellation. Cynosura took place from the 6th to 8 November, with the speakers allotted 21 minutes to present. The conference commemorated the 100-year anniversary of the scandal caused by the String Quartet No.2 in F Sharp Minor by Austrian composter, Arnold Schoenberg, with the atonality that disrupted traditional classic music.

2009: Re-evolution

From 2009 onwards, the University's Cultural Complex of the Meritorious Autonomous University of Puebla became the International Brilliant Minds Festival's official venue. La Ciudad de las Ideas celebrated the International Year of Astronomy with a "night of telescopes" and, from 2009 to 2012, innovative ideas in science and humanities were acknowledged with the Innovation for Humanity Prize and the Entrepreneur for Humanity Prize.

The winners of the Innovation for Humanity Prize in 2008 were Daniel Dennett and Steven Pinker, while the Entrepreneur for Humanity Prize acknowledged nearly 300 individuals.

2010: The origins of the future
In 2010, CDI commemorated two historical events relevant to Mexico: the Bicentennial Independence Day Anniversary and the Centennial Anniversary of the Mexican Revolution. The 2010 edition took place in the University Cultural Complex at the Meritorious Autonomous University of Puebla from the 11th to 13 November, where over 33 speakers attended.

The winners of the Innovation for Humanity Prize in 2009 were Dan Ariely and Philip Zimbardo, and the Entrepreneur for Humanity Prize acknowledged 200 individuals.

2011: Reset
This edition of CDI took place from the 10th to 12 November 2011 in the University Cultural Complex at the Meritorious Autonomous University of Puebla. As in 2009, the "night of telescopes" took place on Friday the 11th at 7pm.

The winners of the Innovation for Humanity Prize in 2010 were Michio Kaku and Richard Dawkins. The Entrepreneur for Humanity Prize was awarded to 120 individuals.

2012: The Magic of If

The fifth edition of the festival was titled "The Magic of If". This edition took place from the 8th to 10 November 2012 in the University Cultural Complex at the Meritorious Autonomous University of Puebla. It included a new section dedicated to Mexican talent, called "Mex-I-can" and, on the other hand, the time for speakers to present reduced from 21 to 12 minutes.

The winners of the Innovation for Humanity Prize in 2011 were Eduard Punset, Oliver Stone and Dambisa Moyo. For the 2012 edition, the Entrepreneur for Humanity Prize was transformed into a prize with great reach and significance, turning into an initiative that stimulates social entrepreneurship projects, called Gifted Citizen Prize.

2013: Dangerous Ideas
The festival's sixth edition took place from 7 to 9 November 2013, with the title of "Dangerous Ideas". Ciudad de las Ideas 2013 also took place in the University Cultural Complex at the Meritorious Autonomous University of Puebla and includes a new curatorial topic, "W-Under 18" that invited children and youth that are changing the world, like Jack Andraka, Boyan Slat, and Umi Garrett.

2014: Change the Word 
The seventh edition of La Ciudad de las Ideas Festival took place from November 6 to 8. This was the first time that Metropolitan Auditorium of Puebla held the event.

2015: What's the Point? 
The 8th edition of CDI was held from November 5 to 7 at the Metropolitan Auditorium of Puebla. In this edition we were accompanied by Isaac Hernández and Esteban Hernández who danced accompanied by the amazing Yuan Yuan Tan and Jurgita Dronina, as well as other 60 than 60 speakers participated.

2016: Play the Game 
Play the Game took place from November 18 to 20. The Festival had great personalities such as Tim Urban and artistic talents such as Julieta Venegas, Ximena Sariñana, Butterscotch among others.

2017: Beyond X November 
CDI 2017 took place at the Metropolitan Auditorium of Puebla, on November 17, 18 and 19. The tenth edition was full of amazing surprises and amazing speakers like Mario Molina, Noam Chomshy, Steven Pinker, Esther Perel among many others

2018: The Burning Questions 
The Burning Questions took place at the Metropolitan Auditorium of Puebla on November 16, 17 and 18. More than 60 speakers from different areas such as economics, science, politics, technology and more participated.

2019: This Is Epic! 
The XII Edition of the International Festival of Bright Minds: CDI 2019 This Is Epic took place from November 8 to 10 at the Metropolitan Auditorium of Puebla. Personalities such as Rigoberta Menchú, Guy Nattiv, Stefan Sagmeister, Siddhartha Mukherjee, Javier Santaolalla, Yusef Salaam among many others showed up making all the Auditorium felt amazed.

Gifted Citizen Initiative 

This initiative began at La Ciudad de las Ideas 2012. Submitted projects are evaluated by a committee and the conference Board of Directors. The projects can be scientific, technological, social, ecological or artistic in nature, as well as concerning development or human rights. The most outstanding project is awarded US$100,000. This prize is given in association with the Singularity University. Furthermore, the prize is backed up with the help of sponsors like Exitus Capital and Aeroméxico.

The GZ Prize was known as the "Entrepreneur for Humanity Prize" in the 2009, 2010 and 2011 conferences.

Speakers
The following is a list of people who have spoken at the Ciudad de las Ideas:

2008 
Theme: "Cynosura"

2009 
Theme: "Re-Evolution"

2010 
Theme: "The Origins of the Future"

2011 
Theme: "Reset"

2012 
Theme: "Magic of If"

2013 
Theme: "Dangerous Ideas"

2014 
Theme: "Change the World"

2015 
Theme: "What's the Point?"

2016 
Theme: "Play the Game"

2017 

Theme: "Beyond X"

2018 
Theme: "The Burning Questions"

2019 
Theme: This Is Epic!

Ideasta
A term coined by Dr. Andrés Roemer which refers to the assistant of La Ciudad de las Ideas, one of the most important international festivals of bright minds held in Puebla City, Mexico, person who participates, encourages and otherwise interacts with the project that celebrates the most brilliant minds in the globe, but also formulates creative and revolutionary ideas about the world; a 'converter of society in an inclusive prosperity' and the one who comes up with new ways of thinking in order to create more knowledge, novel paradigms, innovations and inventions in order to enhance its mind and open it multiple horizons, allowing it grow and development, because ideas:

See also 

 List of CDI speakers
 Eduard Punset
 TED (conference)
 The Third Culture

References

International cultural organizations
Non-profit organizations based in Mexico
Recurring events established in 2008
International conferences in Mexico
Annual events in Mexico